Chaseta is a small town in central Malawi near Lake Malawi lying  west of Chipoka. It is located in Salima District in the Central Region, along the T365 road, to the west of Lifisi.

References

Populated places in Central Region, Malawi